The Finnish Literature Society ( or ) was founded in 1831 to promote literature written in Finnish. Among its first publications was the Kalevala, the Finnish national epic.

External links

Official website (English)

Finnish writers' organisations
Organisations based in Helsinki